The men's team foil was one of eight fencing events on the fencing at the 1968 Summer Olympics programme. It was the twelfth appearance of the event. The competition was held from 18 to 19 October 1968. 79 fencers from 17 nations competed.

Rosters

Argentina
 Orlando Nannini
 Guillermo Saucedo
 Omar Vergara
 Evaristo Prendes

Canada
 Magdy Conyd
 Peter Bakonyi
 Gerry Wiedel
 John Andru

Cuba
 Eduardo Jhons
 Orlando Ruíz
 Jesús Gil
 Dagoberto Borges

Egypt
 Ahmed El-Hamy El-Husseini
 Mohamed Gamil El-Kalyoubi
 Moustafa Soheim
 Ahmed Zein El-Abidin

France
 Jean-Claude Magnan
 Daniel Revenu
 Christian Noël
 Gilles Berolatti
 Jacques Dimont

Great Britain
 Allan Jay
 Graham Paul
 Nick Halsted
 Mike Breckin
 Bill Hoskyns

Hungary
 Sándor Szabó
 Jenő Kamuti
 László Kamuti
 Gábor Füredi
 Attila May

Ireland
 Fionbarr Farrell
 John Bouchier-Hayes
 Michael Ryan
 Colm O'Brien

Italy
 Pasquale La Ragione
 Alfredo Del Francia
 Nicola Granieri
 Arcangelo Pinelli
 Michele Maffei

Japan
 Masaya Fukuda
 Heizaburo Okawa
 Fujio Shimizu
 Kazuhiko Wakasugi
 Kazuo Mano

Mexico
 Vicente Calderón
 Román Gómez
 Carlos Calderón
 Gustavo Chapela
 Héctor Abaunza

Poland
 Zbigniew Skrudlik
 Witold Woyda
 Egon Franke
 Ryszard Parulski
 Adam Lisewski

Romania
 Ion Drîmbă
 Mihai Țiu
 Ștefan Haukler
 Tănase Mureșanu
 Iuliu Falb

Soviet Union
 Yury Sisikin
 Viktor Putyatin
 German Sveshnikov
 Yury Sharov
 Vasyl Stankovych

United States
 Herbert Cohen
 Albie Axelrod
 Uriah Jones
 Larry Anastasi
 Jeffrey Checkes

Venezuela
 Silvio Fernández
 Félix Piñero
 Freddy Salazar
 Luis García

West Germany
 Jürgen Theuerkauff
 Friedrich Wessel
 Tim Gerresheim
 Jürgen Brecht
 Dieter Wellmann

Results

Round 1

Pool A

Pool B

Pool C

Pool D

Pool E

Elimination rounds 

 Main bracket

 Consolation

Final ranking

References

Foil team
Men's events at the 1968 Summer Olympics